The Charlotte Allen Fountain is a 1912 limestone fountain by an unknown artist, installed in Elizabeth Baldwin Park, Houston, in the U.S. state of Texas. The fountain commemorates Charlotte Baldwin Allen, the wife of the city's founder, Augustus Chapman Allen. According to the Houston Parks and Recreation Department, the fountain once had a centerpiece, and "there are no records of its purchase or installation".

See also

 List of public art in Houston

References

1912 establishments in Texas
1912 sculptures
Fountains in Texas
Limestone sculptures in the United States
Monuments and memorials in Texas
Outdoor sculptures in Houston